Dipsas viguieri, Bocourt's snail-eater, is a non-venomous snake found in Panama, and Colombia.

References

Dipsas
Snakes of North America
Snakes of South America
Reptiles of Panama
Reptiles of Colombia
Reptiles described in 1884
Taxa named by Marie Firmin Bocourt